Senator Lombardi may refer to:

Frank Lombardi (fl. 2010s), Rhode Island State Senate
Tarky Lombardi Jr. (born 1929), New York State Senator